An oxymoron is a rhetorical device involving the use of contradiction.

Oxymoron may also refer to:
 Oxymoron (band), a punk band
 Oxymoron (album), an album by Schoolboy Q
 Oxymoron (Nik Kershaw album), an album by Nik Kershaw
 The Oxymoron, a student newspaper at the University of Oxford

See also 
 Oxymorrons, an American alternative hip-hop band
 Oxxxymiron, Russian hip-hop artist